D. Jaime Álvares Pereira de Melo (1 September 1684 — 29 May 1749), 3rd Duke of Cadaval, 5th Marquis of Ferreira, and 6th Count of Tentúgal, was a Portuguese nobleman and statesman.

Career 
The Duke was High-Equerry of the Royal Household of Pedro II of Portugal and subsequently that of João V of Portugal. In 1713, he became a Counselor of the State and War.

Family 
Jaime married twice, first to his dead brother's widow, Luísa of Braganza, natural daughter of  King Peter II of Portugal, with whom he had no children, and then to Henriette Julienne Gabrielle de Lorraine, daughter of the Louis de Lorraine, Prince of Lambesc, with whom he had four children, three surviving to adulthood:

 Nuno (1741-1771), 4th Duke of Cadaval, 6th Marquis of Ferreira, 7th Count of Tentúgal.
 Joana, died in infancy.
 Margarida, married Diogo José Vito de Meneses Noronha Coutinho, 5th Marquis of Marialva, 7th Count of Cantanhede.
 Luísa, married Manuel Carlos da Cunha e Távora, 6th Count of São Vicente.

Ancestry

1684 births
1749 deaths
103
Portuguese politicians
Portuguese nobility